Ryan Clayton (born ), is an English former professional rugby league footballer who played in the 2000s and 2010s. He last played for Halifax in the Co-operative Championship.

He has previously played for the Salford City Reds, Huddersfield Giants, Halifax and Castleford (Heritage № 802). Due to injury, Ryan only played in 11-games for Castleford in 2008's Super League XIII. He was contracted at Castleford for 2009 and was looking to get back in the team for the new season.

Ryan's contract was not renewed at the end of the 2009 season, but Castleford re-signed him on 2 November 2009 for an additional year.

Ryan played for Castleford during 2010 but was released on 14 September 2010.

On 16 October 2010 Ryan joined re-joined former club Halifax.

Clayton now works for the Canberra Raiders as a Strength & Conditioning and Rehabilitation Coach and is well renowned for his never ending, boring stories.

References

External links 
(archived by web.archive.org) Salford Squad Profile: Ryan Clayton
(archived by web.archive.org) Salford City Reds Website Homepage
(archived by web.archive.org) Ryan Clayton Castleford profile
(archived by web.archive.org) Statistics at thecastlefordtigers.co.uk

1982 births
Living people
Castleford Tigers players
English rugby league players
Halifax R.L.F.C. players
Huddersfield Giants players
Rugby league second-rows
Salford Red Devils players
Rugby league players from Oldham
Villefranche XIII Aveyron players